Ruhul Amin (–25 August 2014) is a politician from Patuakhali District of Bangladesh. He was elected a member of parliament from Patuakhali-2 in 1988 Bangladeshi general election.

Birth and early life 
Ruhul Amin was born in 1949 in the village of Kaina in Bauphal, Patuakhali.

Career 
Ruhul Amin was a member of the Central Executive Committee of the Jatiya Party. He joined the Jatiya Party in 1982. He was elected a Member of Parliament from Patuakhali-2 constituency as an Jatiya Party candidate in the 1988 Bangladeshi general election. He was defeated by Patuakhali-2 constituency as a candidate of Jatiya Party in the fifth parliamentary elections of 1991 and the seventh parliamentary elections of 12 June 1996.

Death 
Ruhul Amin died on 25 August 2014.

References 

1940s births
2014 deaths
People from Patuakhali district
Jatiya Party (Ershad) politicians
4th Jatiya Sangsad members